Nelson Abadía Aragón (born 5 June 1956) is a Colombian football manager. Since 2017, he currently serves as manager of the Colombia women's team. He is the father of footballer Mario Abadía.

Managerial career
At the end of the 1990s, Abadía managed the "B" team of América de Cali in Categoría Primera C organized by Difutbol. There, he was in charge of several players who turned professional such as Sandro Zuluaga, Alex del Castillo and Róbinson Zapata.

In 2004, Abadía was appointed by the Panamanian football club Tauro F.C. By 2005, the team was within 3 points of playing in the finals. In 2006, he managed the now defunct Centauros Villavicencio in Categoría Primera B. In 2008, he managed Patriotas Boyacá who were 6 points away from playing in the Primera B final.

Since 2014, Abadía has been part of the Colombian women's team, first as Fabián Taborda's technical assistant and then promoted to manager.

Honours

Manager
Colombia Women
Pan American Games: 2019

References

External links

1956 births
Living people
Sportspeople from Cali
Colombian football managers
Colombian expatriate football managers
Colombian expatriate sportspeople in Panama
Expatriate football managers in Panama
Tauro F.C. managers
Colombia women's national football team managers
Association football coaches
20th-century Colombian people
21st-century Colombian people
Patriotas Boyacá managers
Atlético Huila managers